Lafayette Square Historic District may refer to:

 Lafayette Square Historic District (St. Louis, Missouri), listed on the NRHP in Missouri
 Lafayette Square Historic District (Washington, D.C.), listed on the NRHP in Washington, D.C.